The 1935–36 Indiana Hoosiers men's basketball team represented Indiana University. Their head coach was Everett Dean, who was in his 12th year. The team played its home games in The Fieldhouse in Bloomington, Indiana, and was a member of the Big Ten Conference.

The Hoosiers finished the regular season with an overall record of 18–2 and a conference record of 11–1, finishing 1st in the Big Ten Conference.

Roster

Schedule/Results

|-
!colspan=8| Regular Season
|-

References

Indiana
Indiana Hoosiers men's basketball seasons
1935 in sports in Indiana
1936 in sports in Indiana